Ernest Augustus "Rube" Vinson (March 20, 1879 – October 12, 1951) was a Major League Baseball outfielder. He played for the Cleveland Naps and the Chicago White Sox.

Vinson started his professional baseball career in 1904 in the Eastern League. He was purchased by the Naps in August and played 54 games for them as a backup outfielder. He was then sold to the White Sox. In 1906, he played 10 games and batted .250 before being sent to the minor leagues. Vinson later spent two seasons in the New England League. He retired in 1910.

In 1951, Vinson fell from a two-story building while he was washing a window. He died on October 12.

References

External links

1879 births
1951 deaths
Major League Baseball outfielders
Cleveland Naps players
Chicago White Sox players
Providence Grays (minor league) players
Indianapolis Indians players
Peoria Distillers players
Johnstown Johnnies players
Wilmington Peaches players
York White Rozes players
Reading Pretzels players
Lawrence Colts players
Lowell Tigers players
Danville Red Sox players
Baseball players from Delaware
Accidental deaths from falls
Accidental deaths in Pennsylvania